One Indian Girl is a novel by the Indian author Chetan Bhagat. The book is about a girl named Radhika Mehta, who is a worker at the Distressed Debt group of Goldman Sachs, an investment bank.

Plot

The book begins with Radhika making arrangements regarding her marriage with Brijesh Gulati who works as a software engineer for Facebook in San Francisco. She later revealed her childhood and life in Delhi, as a studious, shy and nerdy girl who came from a middle-class family. Radhika has an elder sister, Aditi who was the more beautiful, outgoing, and popular one at their school. She also communicated her thoughts and decisions to her inner judgemental voice or "mini-me" as called.

While trying to engage in conversation with Brijesh, she was unexpectedly contacted by Debashish "Debu" Sen, her ex-boyfriend, who wished to meet her, to which she refused. Then, he suddenly arrived at the resort in Goa where her marriage ceremony was being held. She was further shocked when he infiltrated the puja bhajan ceremony at the wedding reception. She later met him in the hotel gym and admonished him for his past behavior.

It then flashbacks to four years ago, when Radhika began her job training at Goldman Sachs. One evening, she was introduced to Debu through Avinash her batchmate from IIMA. The two started dating and eventually got into a live-in relationship. Radhika applies for the Distressed debt department after a co-worker's suggestion, and soon her grueling schedule starts taking a toll on her personal life and her relationship with Debu. Furthermore, Radhika got a bonus of 150,000 dollars for her hard work and decides to celebrate with Debu who starts feeling a bit intimidated and insecure by her success. They end up having an argument which they resolve, but the cracks in their relationship start showing. 

One year later, Radhika optimistically decides to plan a future with Debu, to which he is skeptical. It leads to another argument where Debu tells Radhika that he wanted a simple girl as a housewife for his partner and he doesn't think Radhika is that person anymore, which culminates with Debu breaking up with her. One month later, Radhika tries to make amends by quitting her job and proposing to Debu, which backfires when she finds him with another woman. Heartbroken, she decides to leave New York and accepts a transfer to Goldman Sachs' Hong Kong office. 

In the Hong Kong office, she adapts well and even gets a big investment deal in the Philippines. During her trip to a luxury island in the Philippines, she gets to know her boss's boss Neel Gupta who is 20 years older than her and finds him very attractive. After signing the deal with the resort owner, Radhika and Neel ended up sleeping together by the beach after drinking at their celebratory dinner. Even after knowing that Neel is married with kids, they both continue with their passionate affair each time they go on a business trip together. After about a year, Radhika realizes that she didn't see a future with Neel as he makes it clear that he doesn't see Radhika as wife material. Heartbroken for a second time, she wanted to resign from her job but Neel instead convinces her to change offices. Thus, she takes another transfer to the London Goldman Sachs branch after breaking up with Neel. Being in London gives Radhika the time to think about a lot of things, one of which is her mother's persistence to arrange her marriage. She finally agrees to give it a chance. Her mother visits her from India, and together they both look for potential grooms for Radhika. She meets several men on marriage sites but almost everyone rejects her due to Radhika's prestigious job and huge salary. Finally, she meets Brijesh and says yes for marriage. 

The story flashes back to the present. Overwhelmed and feeling pressured due to the wedding shenanigans as well as both her ex-boyfriends' presence at her wedding resort, Radhika calls off her wedding. She also talks with both Neel and Debu, refusing their proposals and finally decides to take a break and travel. Four months after everything, Radhika meets up with Brijesh and they decide to have a coffee together. The book ends here, hinting that probably Radhika and Brijesh would date each other again, fall in love and get married.

Reception
A. R. Rahman praised Chetan Bhagat for expressing his feelings and articulating a particular point of view. The book has attracted some controversy due to the mention of The Beauty Myth by feminist author Naomi Wolf. The Indian Express calls the book "a likable handbook for feminists". Most sources described the book as "an improvement over Half Girlfriend."

Plagiarism controversy 
Bhagat was accused of plagiarising this book from a short story written by Anvita Bajpai. The court ordered a suspension of this book for six months after it was launched.

Film adaptation 
The rights for the film adaptation of this novel have been acquired by Sony Pictures International Productions.

References

External links
One Indian Girl at Twitter
One Indian Girl at Facebook

2016 Indian novels
 Novels by Chetan Bhagat
 Rupa Publications books